Cressmont is an unincorporated community in Clay County, in the U.S. state of West Virginia.

History
A post office called Cressmont was established in 1907, and remained in operation until 1935. The name Cressmont most likely is derived from the Crescent Lumber Company.

References

Unincorporated communities in Clay County, West Virginia